À l'Olympia (French; "At the Olympia" in English) may refer to:
Enregistrement Public à l'Olympia 1961, an album by Jacques Brel
Enregistrement Public à l'Olympia 1964, an album by Jacques Brel
En Direct de L'Olympia, a 1966 album by Mireille Mathieu
À l'Olympia (Alan Stivell album), a 1972 album
À l'Olympia (Jorge Ben album), a 1975 album
À l'Olympia (Celine Dion album), a 1994 album
Jeff Buckley Live À L'Olympia, a 1995 album
Émilie Simon À L'Olympia, a 2006 album
 Récital 1961, Édith Piaf at the Olympia
 Récital 1962, Édith Piaf at the Olympia